Pyromorpha is a genus of moths of the family Zygaenidae. Currently species are found in North and Central America.

Species
 Pyromorpha caelebs Blanchard, 1972
 Pyromorpha centralis (Walker, 1854)
 Pyromorpha contermina (H. Edwards, 1884)
 Pyromorpha correbioides (Felder, 1874)
 Pyromorpha dimidiata Herrich-Schäffer, [1854]  – orange-patched smoky moth
 Pyromorpha fusca H. Edwards, 1884
 Pyromorpha josialis (Druce, 1885)
 Pyromorpha marginata (H. Edwards, 1884)
 Pyromorpha martenii (French, 1883)
 Pyromorpha mexicana (Druce, 1884)
 Pyromorpha morio (Druce, 1885)
 Pyromorpha radialis (Walker, [1865])
 Pyromorpha rata (H. Edwards, 1882)
 Pyromorpha thyesta (Druce, 1884)
 Pyromorpha timon (Druce, 1885)

References

Procridinae
Zygaenidae genera